The Remedies were a pioneering Nigerian hiphop music group. It consisted of Eedris Abdulkareem, Tony Tetuila and Eddy Remedy (also known as Eddy Montana).

References

Nigerian hip hop groups
Musical groups from Lagos
Musical groups established in 1997